The McCabe Building is a historic commercial building located at 3120 Hewitt Avenue in Everett, Washington. The two-story brick structure was completed in 1892 and was listed on the National Register of Historic Places on October 21, 1977.

See also
 National Register of Historic Places listings in Snohomish County, Washington

References

Commercial buildings on the National Register of Historic Places in Washington (state)
1892 establishments in Washington (state)
Buildings and structures completed in 1892
Romanesque Revival architecture in Washington (state)
National Register of Historic Places in Everett, Washington